Gamma-aminobutyric acid receptor subunit alpha-1 is a protein that in humans is encoded by the GABRA1 gene.

GABA is the major inhibitory neurotransmitter in the mammalian brain where it acts at GABA-A receptors, which are ligand-gated chloride channels. Chloride conductance of these channels can be modulated by agents such as benzodiazepines that bind to the GABA-A receptor. At least 16 distinct subunits of GABA-A receptors have been identified.

The GABRA1 receptor is the specific target of the z-drug class of nonbenzodiazepine hypnotic agents and is responsible for their hypnotic and hallucinogenic effects.

See also
 GABAA receptor

References

Further reading

Ion channels